Fritz Volbach (17 December 1861 – 30 November 1940) was a German conductor, composer and musicologist.

Life 
Volbach was born in 1861 in Wipperfürth. He studied philosophy at the Ruprecht-Karls-Universität Heidelberg and Rheinische Friedrich-Wilhelms-Universität Bonn. In 1886 he became a pupil of the Royal Institute for Church Music, before continuing his studies with Eduard Grell at the Academy of Arts, Berlin in the composition department; he was probably his last pupil.

After his studies he worked as a teacher at the Institute for Church Music in 1887; he also conducted the Academic Liedertafel and a choir. In 1891 he became music director in Mainz. In 1899 he received his doctorate from the University of Bonn. In 1907 he became music director in Tübingen and was appointed professor. During the First World War he founded a German symphony orchestra in occupied Belgium with  under the occupiers in Brussels. From 1918 he taught at the University of Münster and was also music director and director of the music association of Münster until 1925. In 1929 he became Emeritus.

Volbach's compositions include an opera, a symphony and three symphonic poems. His compositions show him to be a conservative late romantic.

Volbach died in Wiesbaden at age 79.

Some works 
 Es waren zwei Königskinder, Symphonic Poem, Op. 21 (1900).
 Quintett für Klavier und Bläser, Op. 24 (1902)
 Raffael. Three mood pictures for choir, orchestra and organ (1902).
 Symphony in B minor, Op. 33 (1909).
 Piano quintet in D minor, Op. 36 (1912).

Publications 
 Die Praxis der Händelaufführung. Dissertation, Bonn 1899.
 Georg Friedrich Händel. (Berühmte Musiker - Lebens- und Charakterbilder nebst Einführung in die Werke der Meister. Volume II). 2. Auflage. Schlesische Verlagsanstalt, Berlin 1906.
 Die deutsche Musik im neunzehnten Jahrhundert. Nach der Grundlagen ihrer Entwicklung und ihren Haupterscheinungen. Kösel, Kempten/München 1909.
 Erläuterungen zu den Klaviersonaten Beethovens. Ein Buch für Jedermann. (Tongers Musikbücherei. Volume 12/14). P.J. Tonger, Köln 1924 (3rd edition).
 Beethoven. 2nd edition. Kirchheim & Co, Mainz 1929.
 Der Chormeister. Ein praktisches Handbuch für Chordirigenten mit besonderer Berücksichtigung des Männerchors. New, extended edition. Schott, Mainz 1936.
 Die Instrumente des Orchesters. Ihr Wesen und ihre Entwicklung. (Aus Natur und Geisteswelt, Volume 384). Teubner, Leipzig/Berlin 1913.
 Das moderne Orchester. Volume 1. Das Zusammenspiel der Instrumente in seiner Entwicklung. 2nd edition. Teubner, Leipzig/Berlin 1919.
 Das moderne Orchester. Volume 1: Die Instrumente des Orchesters. 2. Auflage. Teubner, Leipzig/Berlin 1921. Moderni orhestar. Njegov razvitak. Translation into Croatian by Božidar Širola. Edition Slave, Wien 1922.
 Handbuch der Musikwissenschaften. Volume 1. Musikgeschichte, Kulturquerschnitte, Formenlehre, Tonwerkzeuge und Partitur. Aschendorffsche Verlagsbuchhandlung, Münster 1926.
 Handbuch der Musikwissenschaften. Volume 2. Ästhetik, Akustik u. Tonphysiologie, Tonpsychologie. Aschendorffsche Verlagsbuchhandlung, Münster 1930.
 Erlebtes und Erstrebtes. E. Schneider, Mainz 1956.

Literature 
 Klaus Hortschansky: Fritz Volbach (1861–1940). Komponist, Dirigent und Musikwissenschaftler. Festschrift zum 60jährigen Bestehen des Musikwissenschaftlichen Seminars der Westfälischen Wilhelms-Universität Münster. (Beiträge zur westfälischen Musikgeschichte 20). v.d. Linnepe, Hagen 1987, .
 Der Komponist Fritz Volbach erzählt aus seinem Leben. In: Hans Kraus: Alter Bergischer Brauch - in Florenz wiederentdeckt. (. Volume 36/1966). Heider, Bergisch Gladbach 1965,

References

External links 

 
 Institut für Musikwissenschaft an der Universität Münster
 
 Fritz Volbach: 
 

1861 births
1940 deaths
German conductors (music)
German male classical composers
German male conductors (music)
German music historians
German musicologists
German Romantic composers
People from Wipperfürth
Academic staff of the University of Münster
Academic staff of the University of Tübingen
20th-century German male musicians
19th-century German male musicians